Wendy Jane Abraham  (born 6 May 1960) is a judge of the Federal Court of Australia, sitting in Sydney. She was appointed on 7 May 2019 for a term to end 6 May 2030. Abraham took silk in 1998 and is a member of the bars of South Australia (1982) and New South Wales (2005).

Abraham is an expert in criminal law. Beginning in 1983, she was a counsel to the Director of Public Prosecutions of South Australia, and later established a national criminal appellate practice. She appeared before the High Court of Australia for the Commonwealth Director of Public Prosecutions in R v Tang, securing the first criminal conviction for slavery in Australian history. In 2003, she advised the Australian Law Reform Commission on the use of genetic evidence in prosecutions.

Notable cases 

Justice Abraham was assigned the Afghan Files case: Australian Broadcasting Corporation v Kane (No 2). She ruled in February 2020 that a warrant issued to the Australian Federal Police to search the offices of the Australian Broadcasting Corporation was valid.

Works

References 

Australian King's Counsel
Australian women judges
21st-century Australian judges
Judges of the Federal Court of Australia
1960 births
Living people
21st-century women judges